Colin Thurston (13 July 1947 – 15 January 2007) was an English recording engineer and record producer.

Born in Brentford, Middlesex, Thurston played in bands in London before he "bluffed his way" into audio engineering.  After meeting Tony Visconti, he co-engineered David Bowie's "Heroes" and Iggy Pop's Lust for Life (both 1977); he is also credited with co-producing the latter album with Bowie and Pop, under the collective pseudonym "Bewlay Bros".

Thurston's debut as a solo producer was Magazine's second album Secondhand Daylight (1979). He later recalled, "I think they were a bit nervous and so I didn't tell them it was my first production". The same year, he produced the Human League's first album, Reproduction and their single "I Don't Depend on You" released under the name of The Men. His lesser-known productions around this time included the single "Move in Rhythm" by Airkraft (1980) on the Square record label, now a collector's piece, and the EP Digital Cowboy with the hit-single "Target for Life" by Our Daughter's Wedding, from 1981.

He achieved widespread recognition with Duran Duran's debut album (1981) and the follow-up Rio (1982); bassist John Taylor later described Thurston as "a major catalyst for the Eighties sound". After working with Duran Duran he produced Talk Talk's The Party's Over (1982), and Kajagoogoo's White Feathers (1983), the latter with Duran Duran's Nick Rhodes. He also worked with Gary Numan on his 1985 album The Fury.

Thurston became an in-house producer for the Canadian independent record label Brouhaha in the late 1980s, working with acts such as Westwon, before the company dissolved. In 1999, he was again associated with Duran Duran for the Strange Behaviour remix compilation.

Thurston had been suffering from a long illness and doing occasional production work before he died on 15 January 2007.

References

1947 births
2007 deaths
English audio engineers
English record producers
English new wave musicians
People from Brentford
Duran Duran
20th-century British businesspeople